Tiberius Claudius Nero ( 204–202 BC) was a Roman senator. In 204 BC, as praetor, he was assigned to govern Sardinia, in which capacity he gathered and shipped supplies of grain and clothing for soldiers under the command of Scipio in Africa. Elected consul for 202 BC, he was assigned to Africa with imperium equal to that of Scipio, but storms and delays in his preparations prevented him from ever arriving. His consular colleague was M. Servilius Pulex Geminus.

He was the last consul of the Claudii Nerones until his descendant (the future emperor) Tiberius was elected in 13 BC.

It is possible that this Nero was the one who in 172 BC participated in diplomatic missions. The historical sources for which pose difficulties. Livy says he was sent on an embassy with a Marcus Decimius to Asia and islands in the Aegean, including Rhodes and Crete, and travelled as far as Syria and Egypt. His task was to renew friendships and alliances, and to gather information on the influence of Perseus of Macedon. Polybius says he was accompanied by Postumius Albinus and a Marcus Junius Brutus, and describes their mission as urging the allies, particularly Rhodes, to join the Romans against Perseus. Livy also has a similar account (42.45.1–7) that seems to repeat but confuse what he had reported earlier. It is also possible that this Claudius Nero was either the Tiberius Claudius Nero who was praetor in 178 BC, or the praetor of 181 BC who had the same name. It is possible that the two later are also one and the same, possibly the consuls son.

References
Dates, offices, and ancient sources unless otherwise noted from T.R.S. Broughton, The Magistrates of the Roman Republic (American Philological Association, 1951, 1986), vol. 1, pp. 306, 315, 412–413, 415 (notes 4 and 5); vol. 2 (1952), p. 546.

3rd-century BC Roman consuls
3rd-century BC Roman praetors
2nd-century BC diplomats
Tiberius
Roman governors of Sardinia